Podalyria calyptrata (locally called keurtjie or water blossom pea) is a small, resilient, fast-growing tree of the Fabaceae (legume) family. It has velvety silver leaves, bears masses of bright-pink, sweetly scented flowers, and is indigenous to the Western Cape, South Africa.

Description
Podalyria calyptrata is a small, tough, fast-growing tree  around 4 meters in height. The simple, oval leaves are silvery grey and velvety in texture.

The bright-pink, strongly fragrant flowers are very striking and usually appear in spring (although flowering time varies). The flowers are very strongly fragrant, and their sweet scent can be smelled from afar.
The seeds are contained in hard little pods that appear considerably later.

Distribution and habitat
This tree occurs from Cape Town northwards as far as Tulbagh and eastwards across the Cape Fold mountains. It grows amongst fynbos and on the verges of forests.

Cultivation
Once established, P. calyptrata tolerates wind, frost, and drought, but it is healthiest when it gets regular water and it does not grow well in highly salty or alkaline soils. Overall, it is very easy to grow.
It makes a good informal hedge or screen along the edge of a property. It also makes a handsome specimen plant, with its bright flowers and attractive foliage. If  planted in full sun and lightly pruned of young shoots, it becomes more bushy. If planted in the shade, it tends to become a taller tree, with less dense foliage.

Podalyria calyptrata can easily be propagated from seed. Allow the seeds to soak briefly in warm water before planting them.

References

External links

Podalyria calyptrata at PlantZAfrica.com

Podalyrieae
Endemic flora of South Africa
Flora of the Cape Provinces
Fynbos
Trees of South Africa
Afromontane flora
Trees of Mediterranean climate
Garden plants of Southern Africa
Ornamental trees